Karenth Zabala Terrazas (born 10 July 1996) is an American-raised Bolivian footballer who plays as a midfielder for the Bolivia women's national team.

Early life
Zabala is originally from the Santa Cruz Department, but moved to the United States at young age. She is now a resident of Falls Church, Virginia.

College career
Zabala attended Mississippi Valley State University in Mississippi Valley State, Mississippi.

International career
Zabala represented Bolivia at the 2014 South American U-20 Women's Championship. At senior level, she played the 2018 Copa América Femenina.

References

1996 births
Living people
Women's association football midfielders
Women's association football forwards
Bolivian women's footballers
People from Santa Cruz Department (Bolivia)
Bolivia women's international footballers
Bolivian emigrants to the United States
People with acquired American citizenship
American women's soccer players
Soccer players from Virginia
People from Falls Church, Virginia
Mississippi Valley State Devilettes soccer players